Tlaltecatzin was from the city of  Cuauhchinanco (present day Puebla, Mexico).  

According to Fernando de Alva Ixtlilxochitl's writings in Obras historicas, Tlaltecatzin lived with Techotlala, who ruled Texcoco. During this time, Texcoco was becoming an important political and cultural center. It was said he spoke elegantly thanks to the nurse who raised him, Papaloxochitl.

Poetry
Tlaltecatzin has been remembered as a poet even though only one of his poems is known to survive. It was recorded twice in post-conquest documents. Several poets refer to him. The poet Chichicuepon from Chalco said, "Tlaltecatzin... lived happily..."

Poems attributed to Tlaltecatzin include:

Tlaltecatzin Icuic, Cuauhchinanco (Song of Tlaltecatzin, Cuauhchinanco)

Fragment of Tlaltecatzin Icuic:

Tlaltecatzin making a discernment on how pleasant was being finally home for him.

References

Nahuatl-language poets
Place of birth unknown
Place of death unknown
1400s deaths
14th-century births